Buphthalmum is a genus of flowering plants in the aster family, Asteraceae. There are 2 or 3 species. They are native to Europe, and B. salicifolium is in cultivation and has been introduced elsewhere.

These are perennial herbs with alternately arranged leaves. The inflorescence is a solitary flower head atop the stem. The head has very narrow phyllaries, yellow ray florets and yellow disc florets. The fruit is a cypsela usually tipped with a pappus of scales; those growing from the ray florets may lack pappi.

 Accepted species
 Buphthalmum inuloides    – Sardinia
 Buphthalmum salicifolium – western, central, + southern Europe; introduced in China, southeast Asia

References

Inuleae
Asteraceae genera
Flora of Europe
Taxa named by Carl Linnaeus